Kevin Stephen Corbett (born December 5, 1955) is an American transportation and economic development executive. He became President and CEO of New Jersey Transit (NJT), the New Jersey state public transportation agency, in February 2018.

Background
Corbett was born December 5, 1955. His father, Andrew Corbett, of Pelham, New York, was the chairman of A. J. Corbett & Sons, a steamship agency and maritime consultancy.

He is a graduate of Georgetown University. He serves as a Blue and Gold Officer for the U.S. Naval Academy. He was a fellow of Woodrow Wilson School of Public and International Affairs.

Corbett married Siobhan Alden, a physician, in 1991. He and his wife reside in Mendham; both use NJ Transit regularly. The couple own a private home and a 5-acre farm in the town.

Career
Corbett was a vice president of the global transportation consulting firm AECOM.  

Corbett was a vice president of Wilhelmsen Lines, a shipping company in Oslo, and was the general manager of its subsidiary in New York, the Barber West Africa Line. He has worked for the Port Authority of New York and New Jersey, the Empire State Development Corporation (Executive VP and COO) and Galliford Try.

Corbett has been on the board of the New York League of Conservation Voters, the Regional Plan Association, the Maritime Association of the Port of New York and New Jersey. and the Tri-State Transportation Campaign.

New Jersey Transit
New Jersey Governor Phil Murphy has called NJT a "national disgrace". In January 2018, Murphy asked for resignation letters from approximately 20 senior staff members, and signed an executive order calling for a complete audit.
Corbett was appointed by Murphy in January 2018. He will replace Steven Santoro, who announced he will resign in April 2018. At his introduction, Corbett said there is "untapped value" in the agency.

During his tenure, NJ Transit implemented the federally required Positive Train Control (PTC) safety system, with work completed in December 2020.

NJ Transit had no 'capital plan' when Corbett took over. He contracted one, expected in December 2019.

In February 2020 there were calls for his resignation citing the lack of improvement in service in his two year tenure.

In June 2020, Corbett revealed a 5-year Capital Plan with over $16 billion in capital spending and the agency's first 10-year Strategic Plan.

See also
Diane Gutierrez-Scaccetti
Governorship of Phil Murphy
George Warrington
James Weinstein (New Jersey official)
Richard A. White

Further reading

References 

1955 births
Living people
Georgetown University alumni
NJ Transit people
Port Authority of New York and New Jersey people
People from Mendham Township, New Jersey